Robert Lionel Whitby  (29 October 1928 — January 2003) was an English first-class cricketer.

The son of Robert James Lawrence Whitby, he was born in British India at Calcutta in October 1928. He was educated in England at Charterhouse School, before going up to Caius College, Cambridge. While studying at Cambridge, he played one first-class cricket match for Cambridge University Cricket Club against Essex at Fenner's in 1950. Seven years later he made a second appearance in first-class cricket for the Marylebone Cricket Club against Scotland at Aberdeen. He scored 33 runs in these two matches, while with his right-arm medium-fast bowling, he bowled 38 wicket-less overs. Whitby was appointed a Member of the Royal Victorian Order, 4th Class in the 1968 New Years Honours. Whitby died at Portsmouth in January 2003.

References

External links

1928 births
2003 deaths
People from Kolkata
People educated at Charterhouse School
Alumni of Gonville and Caius College, Cambridge
English cricketers
Cambridge University cricketers
Marylebone Cricket Club cricketers
Members of the Royal Victorian Order